Man Trouble is a 1930 American pre-Code drama film directed by Berthold Viertel and written by Marion Orth, George Manker Watters and Edwin J. Burke. The film stars Milton Sills, Dorothy Mackaill, Kenneth MacKenna, Sharon Lynn, Roscoe Karns and Oscar Apfel. The film was released on August 24, 1930, by Fox Film Corporation.

Cast        
Milton Sills as Mac
Dorothy Mackaill as Joan
Kenneth MacKenna as Graham
Sharon Lynn as Trixie
Roscoe Karns as Scott
Oscar Apfel as Eddie
James Bradbury Jr. as Goofy
Harvey Clark as Uncle Joe
Edythe Chapman as Aunt Maggie
Lew Harvey as Chris
Paul Fix as The Kid - A Gunman

References

External links 
 

1930 films
1930s English-language films
Fox Film films
American drama films
1930 drama films
Films directed by Berthold Viertel
American black-and-white films
1930s American films